Der Fuehrer's Face (originally titled A Nightmare in Nutziland or Donald Duck in Nutziland ) is a 1943 American animated anti-Nazi propaganda short film produced by Walt Disney Productions, created in 1942 and released on January 1, 1943 by RKO Radio Pictures. The cartoon, which features Donald Duck in a nightmare setting working at a factory in Nazi Germany, was made in an effort to sell war bonds and is an example of American propaganda during World War II. The film was directed by Jack Kinney and written by Joe Grant and  Dick Huemer. Spike Jones released a version of Oliver Wallace's theme for the short before the film was released.

Der Fuehrer's Face won the Oscar for Best Animated Short Film at the 15th Academy Awards. It is the only Donald Duck film to receive the honor, although eight other films have also been nominated. In 1994, it was voted Number 22 of "the 50 Greatest Cartoons" of all time by members of the animation field. However, because of the propagandistic nature of the short and the depiction of Donald Duck as a Nazi (albeit a deeply reluctant one), Disney kept the film out of general circulation after its original release. Its first home release came in 2004 with the release of the third wave of the Walt Disney Treasures DVD sets.

Plot
A German oom-pah bandcomposed of Axis powers leaders Joseph Goebbels on the trombone, Heinrich Himmler on the snare drum, Hideki Tojo on the sousaphone, Hermann Goering on the piccolo and Benito Mussolini on the bass drummarches noisily at four o'clock in the morning through a small town where the trees, windmills, fence posts, and even the clouds are shaped like swastikas while singing the virtues of the Nazi doctrine. A familiar character, Donald Duck lives in a nightmare world, a Nazi German forced to produce artillery shells under terrible conditions. His cuckoo clock with a bird that is dressed up as Adolf Hitler heils as a clock chime, only for Donald to throw a shoe at it. Passing by Donald's house (the features of which depict Hitler), the band members poke him out of bed with a bayonet to get him ready for work. Here Donald then faces and heils the portraits of Der Fuehrer (Hitler), the Emperor of Japan (Hirohito), and Il Duce (Mussolini) respectively, then goes to make breakfast.

Because of wartime rationing, Donald's breakfast consists of bread that is so stale and hard it resembles wood (and must be sliced using a saw), coffee brewed from a single hoarded coffee bean, and a bacon and egg-flavored breath spray. The band shoves a copy of Mein Kampf in front of him for a moment of reading, then marches into his house and escorts him to a factory, with Donald now carrying the bass drum and Goering kicking him.

Upon arriving at the factory (at bayonet-point), Donald starts his comical 48-hour daily shift of screwing caps onto artillery shells coming at him in an assembly line. Mixed in with the shells are portraits of Der Fuehrer, so Donald must perform the Hitler salute every time a portrait appears, all the while screwing the caps onto shells, much to his disgust. Each new batch of shells is of a different size, ranging from individual bullets to massive shells as large as Donald (if not larger). The pace of the assembly line intensifies (as in the Charlie Chaplin comedy Modern Times), and Donald finds it increasingly hard to complete all the tasks. At the same time, he is bombarded with propaganda messages about the purported superiority of the Aryan race and the glory of working for Der Fuehrer. When Donald momentarily grumbles in frustration towards his situation, the Nazi guards overseeing him overhear him and draw their bayonets at him, forcing him to fearfully recant his complaints.

After a "paid vacation" that consists of making swastika shapes with his body for a few seconds in front of a painted backdrop of the Alps as exercise, Donald is ordered to work overtime. He has a nervous breakdown with hallucinations of artillery shells everywhere, some of which are snakes and birds, some sing and are the same shape of the marching band from the start, music and all (some of the animation from this sequence is recycled from the "Pink Elephants on Parade" sequence from Dumbo).

When the hallucinations clear, Donald finds himself in his bed, and realizes that the whole experience was a nightmare; however, he sees the shadow of a figure holding its right hand up. Believing it is a Nazi salute, he begins to do so himself until he realizes that it is the shadow of a miniature Statue of Liberty, holding her torch high in her right hand. Remembering that he lives in the United States, Donald embraces the statue, saying, "Am I glad to be a citizen of the United States of America!"

The short ends with a caricature of Hitler's angry face, and a tomato is thrown at it, forming the words The End.

Voice cast
Clarence Nash as Donald Duck
Cliff Edwards as Nazi lead singer
Charles Judels as Off-stage Nazi

Song

Before the film's release, the popular band Spike Jones and His City Slickers, noted for their parodies of popular songs of the time, released a version of Oliver Wallace's theme song, "Der Fuehrer's Face" (also known informally as "The Nazi Song") in September 1942 on RCA Victor Bluebird Records #11586. Unlike the version in the cartoon, some Spike Jones versions contain the sound effect of an instrument he called the "birdaphone", a rubber razzer (also known as the Bronx Cheer) with each "Heil!" to show contempt for Hitler (Instead, the cartoon version features the sound of a tuba.) The so-called "Bronx Cheer" was a well-known expression of disgust in that time period and was not deemed obscene or offensive. The sheet music cover bears the image of Donald Duck throwing a tomato in Hitler's face. In the Jones version, the chorus line, "Ja, we is the supermen—" is answered by a soloist's "Super-duper super men!" effeminately delivered suggesting the prevalence of epicenes in the Party; in the Disney version, these lines are flatly delivered but with effeminate gestures by Hermann Göring. The recording was very popular, peaking at No. 3 on the U.S. chart.

Other versions
Johnny Bond recorded the song in July 1942 on the OKeh label.
Tommy Trinder recorded the song in the United Kingdom soon after the cartoon's release.
Harry Turtledove adapted the song in one of his Colonization novels, in tune with the novel's theme of an alternate history alien invasion during World War II.

Political themes
Although the film portrays events in Nazi Germany, its release came while the United States also was on total war footing. Coffee, meat and food oils were rationed, civilians were heavily employed in military production, and propaganda in support of the war effort (such as the film itself) was pervasive. The film's criticism therefore emphasizes violence and terror under the Nazi government, as compared with the dull grind that all the warring nations faced.

Censorship
In 2010, Der Fuehrer's Face was ruled by a local court in Kamchatka, Russia to be included in the national list of extremist materials, which was first created in 2002. This was due to a local who received a suspended sentence of six months for uploading it to the internet and "inciting hatred and enmity". On July 21, 2016, another Russian court reversed the ruling of the local court, removing the short film from the list. The court highlighted that the film's portrayal of Nazism through caricature form cannot be deemed "extremist" in nature.

In popular culture
In August 1943, the cover of Four Favorites #11, depicted The Unknown Soldier, Captain Courageous, Lightning, and Magno (along with Davey, his boy partner) all singing "Der Fuehrer's Face", while an anthropomorphic war bond simultaneously knocks out Emperor Hirohito, Adolf Hitler, and Benito Mussolini in one punch.

Home media
The short was released on May 18, 2004 on Walt Disney Treasures: Walt Disney on the Front Lines.

See also
Education for Death
Blitz Wolf
Commando Duck
List of World War II short films

Further reading
Young, Jordan R. (2005). Spike Jones Off the Record: The Man Who Murdered Music (3rd edition) Albany: BearManor Media .

References

External links
  

Der Fuehrer's Face on the Encyclopedia of Disney Animated Shorts 

1943 films
1943 animated films
1943 short films
Protest songs
Films about Adolf Hitler
Cultural depictions of Benito Mussolini
Cultural depictions of Hermann Göring
Cultural depictions of Joseph Goebbels
Cultural depictions of Heinrich Himmler
Cultural depictions of Hirohito
Cultural depictions of Hideki Tojo
Animation based on real people
American World War II propaganda shorts
Best Animated Short Academy Award winners
1940s Disney animated short films
Donald Duck short films
Films about Nazi Germany
Films about nightmares
Films directed by Jack Kinney
Films produced by Walt Disney
Films scored by Oliver Wallace
Bluebird Records singles